Sunnydale is an unincorporated community in Sedgwick County, Kansas, United States.  It is located at Hillside St and 101st St N.

History
A post office was opened in Sunnydale (also historically Sunny Dale) in 1877, and remained in operation until it was discontinued in 1901.

Education
The community is served by Valley Center USD 262 public school district.

References

Further reading

External links
 Sedgwick County maps: Current, Historic, KDOT

Unincorporated communities in Sedgwick County, Kansas
Unincorporated communities in Kansas